Hammons Field is a minor league baseball stadium located in Springfield, Missouri, with a capacity of 7,986 plus approximately 2,500 general admission seating. The facility, funded entirely by local businessman, hotel mogul and benefactor John Q. Hammons, is the centerpiece of the midtown development project, Jordan Valley Park, on the corner of Sherman Avenue and Trafficway Boulevard. Completed in April 2004, it is home to the Springfield Cardinals, the Texas League affiliate of the St. Louis Cardinals as well as the Missouri State University Bears.

Hammons built the ballpark before he had a minor league team secured to play in the stadium, though he steadfastly assured local residents it would be the Double-A affiliate of the St. Louis Cardinals.  He was ultimately able to persuade the Cardinals to purchase the El Paso Diablos franchise of the Texas League from the Brett Bros. and relocate it to Springfield. They became the Springfield Cardinals soon thereafter when the parent club ended its brief two-year affiliation with the Tennessee Smokies of the Southern League.

In February 2023, the city of Springfield purchased Hammons Field and its surrounding parking lots for $12 million with plans to spend $4 million on stadium improvements.

Features
The stadium is unique due to its baseball specific outbuildings.  The stadium currently has two large buildings just outside the right-field walls.  The larger of the two serves as a fully furnished indoor practice facility complete with astroturf, batting cages, and a small diamond for drills.  The smaller building serves as administration, including General Manager offices, as well as housing both home teams' clubhouses, a cardio workout facility, and the physical trainer's office.

The stadium is also furnished with 28 luxury box suites. Only two of the Press Box level suites are available for use.  The largest of the three is a personal suite for Mr. John Q. Hammons, owner of the facility.

Hammons Field also boasts one of the largest high-definition video boards in Minor League Baseball.

Events
In 2004, 2007 and 2012, the venue hosted the Missouri Valley Conference baseball tournament.

See also
 List of NCAA Division I baseball venues

References

External links
Hammons Field - FAQs
"The Jewel of Jordan Valley Park" Webpage
Joe Mock names Hammons Field BASEBALLPARKS.COM 2005 "Ballpark of the Year"
Hammons Field - BallparkReviews.com
Charlie's Ballparks - John Q. Hammons Field
Minor League News ranks Hammons Field the #5 Minor League Ballpark in America in 2006
Official Springfield Cardinals Site
Texas League Web Site
MSU Baseball Bears Page
Tour of Hammons Field
Designers of Hammons Field

College baseball venues in the United States
Baseball venues in Missouri
Sports venues in Springfield, Missouri
Missouri State Bears baseball
Sports venues in Missouri
Texas League ballparks